The Master Key (大いなる幻影, Ōinaru gen'ei) is a 1962 novel by the Japanese novelist Masako Togawa which received the Edogawa Rampo Prize upon publication. The English translation by Simon Grove was first published by Dodd, Mead & Co in 1985.

It is a mystery story set in the 1950's postwar Ikebukuro, Japan with the setting of K Apartment for Ladies, reserved only for women. Many of the aging residents have their own secrets bound to the master key, which opens all of the 150 rooms in the K Apartment. All the secrets start to unravel when the building is slated for construction work to be moved four meters with the residents inside.

Characters 
Major Characters:
 Katsuko Tojo/Haru Santo - older receptionist with a limp/white haired mysterious resident.
 Kaneko Tamura - younger receptionist.
 Chikako Ueda - previous school teacher who waits for her dead husband.
 Toyoto Munekata - professor guarding her dead husband's manuscripts.
 Noriko Ishiyama - eccentric woman known to other residents as Ms. Bladderwrack who forages for fishbones at night.
 Suwa Yatabe - violinist who previously stole a Guarnerius violin from her teacher.
 Yoneko Kimura - retired school teacher who writes letters to her previous students.
Minor Characters:
 Yasuyo Aoki - mysterious guest of Chikako Ueda.
 Keiko Kawauchi (Mrs. Kraft) - divorced from Major Kraft after disappearance of their son.
 Major D. Kraft - U.S. Army major who returned to the U.S. after divorce from Keiko Kawauchi.
 George Kraft - son of Major Kraft, reported kidnapped and missing.
 Priest - leader of the Three Spirit Faith cult, performs seemingly miraculous revelations.
 Thumbelina the Vestal - small statured woman who is the medium of the séance.

Translation 
 Togawa, Masako. The Master Key. Translated by Grove, Simon. Dodd, Mead & Co. ISBN 9781782273639

References 

Japanese novels
1962 novels
Novels set in Tokyo